Charles Church (7 July 1929 – 11 April 2010) was a Scottish amateur football forward who made over 200 appearances in the Scottish League for Queen's Park.

Personal life 
Church attended St Aloysius' College, Glasgow. He was married with two sons and a daughter and worked for his family's bookmaking company and then as a civil servant.

Honours 
Queen's Park
 Scottish League Second Division: 1955–56

References

Scottish footballers
Scottish Football League players
Association football forwards
Queen's Park F.C. players
1929 births
People from Troon
2010 deaths
People educated at St Aloysius' College, Glasgow
Scotland amateur international footballers
Footballers from South Ayrshire